Lloyd T. Pullen (May 1, 1825 – January 14, 1908) was an American, farmer, writer, and politician.

Born in the town of Anson, Somerset County, Maine, Pullen moved with his parents to Kingfield, Maine in 1832. In 1854, Pullen moved to Argyle, Lafayette County, Wisconsin. In 1857, Pullen moved to Evansville, Wisconsin. He was a farmer and was in the mercantile business. Pullen served in different town local offices in Maine and Wisconsin. Pullen served in the Wisconsin State Assembly in 1861, 1863, and 1876 and was a Republican, Pullen died at his daughter's house in Des Moines, Iowa. In 1904, Pullen published: Pullen's Pencilings and Various Other Subjects, R. M. Antes, Evansville, Wisconsin: 1908.

Notes

1825 births
1908 deaths
People from Anson, Maine
People from Evansville, Wisconsin
Businesspeople from Wisconsin
Farmers from Wisconsin
Writers from Maine
Writers from Wisconsin
Maine local politicians
Wisconsin local politicians
People from Kingfield, Maine
People from Argyle, Wisconsin
19th-century American politicians
Republican Party members of the Wisconsin State Assembly